King's Highway 18A, commonly referred to as Highway 18A, was a provincially maintained highway in the Canadian province of Ontario. The  route began and ended at Highway 18, travelling along the Lake Erie shoreline and through Colchester. It was the southernmost highway to ever exist in Canada, as the only one to travel south of the 42nd parallel. Highway18A was assumed as a provincial highway in 1938. It was transferred to Essex County in 1978, and has since been known as Essex County Road50.

Route description 
Highway18A was a short route that served the headland that protrudes into Lake Erie between Amherstburg and Kingsville in the southernmost part of Essex County. The west junction was at the community of Malden Centre, while the east junction was located on the western edge of Kingsville. Highway18A was the southernmost highway in Canada, and the only one to travel south of the 42ndparallel.

History 
Highway18A was first assigned during the late 1930s. Essex County council requested that the lakefront road between Malden Centre and Kingsville be taken over by the province and designated Highway18A in June 1935.
The Department of Highways (DHO), predecessor to the Ministry of Transportation, assumed the road on April13, 1938.
The gravel road was paved from Colchester to Kingsville in 1951, and from Malden Centre to Colchester in 1952.
Following recommendations presented in the Selkirk Report in June 1976, the renamed Ministry of Transportation and Communications rebuilt the road to proper standards, including bypassing several corners; the bypassed route is now Twin Gables Drive and Dolson Road. Subsequently, the entire length was transferred to Essex County effective July1, 1978. Essex County promptly resigned the route as Essex County Road50.
It is now also known as Heritage Road east of Colchester.

Major intersections

See also 
 List of Essex County Roads

References 

County roads in Essex County, Ontario
018A